Jono Jumamoy (born Jose Jono Jumamoy on November 6, 1986) is the youngest mayor elected in the Philippines history at age 21. The late senator and statesman Ninoy Aquino became the youngest mayor in the Philippines in Concepcion, Tarlac at age 22.

Early life and career
Jumamoy chose to leave his promising pasture at the World Bank instead he went back to Philippines to run as mayor in Inabanga, Bohol on May 14, 2007 elections. He won by over 6,000 votes against his political opponent.

Born to Jose and Maria Socorro Jumamoy, also politicians in Bohol, he finished his elementary and high school education at Holy Spirit School, Grace Christian Military School and Bohol Wisdom School. He entered college at the Centre for International Education in Cebu City, Philippines and later culminated his degree with dual majors in International Business and Management at the Northwood University in West Palm Beach, Florida, USA.

Jumamoy was the Sangguniang Kabataan (SK) Federation president of Inabanga in 2002.

Awards
The Sangguniang Kabataan (SK)paid tribute to Jumamoy as young Boholano achievers in a video shown during the SK Bohol Congress in May 2008.

References

 http://www.bohol.ph/article149.html
 http://www.pia.gov.ph/?m=12&fi=p071109.htm&no=58
 https://web.archive.org/web/20090618104420/http://www.inabanga.gov.ph/

1986 births
Living people
Mayors of places in Bohol